Cancer Science is a monthly peer-reviewed medical journal covering research in oncology, which is published by Wiley-Blackwell on behalf of the Japanese Cancer Association. Established in 1907, the journal publishes original articles, editorials, and letters to the editor, describing original research in the fields of basic, translational, and clinical cancer research. The editor-in-chief is  Kohei Miyazono (University of Tokyo). According to the Journal Citation Reports, the journal has a 2020 impact factor of 6.71, ranking it 50 out of 242 journals in the category "Oncology".

History
The journal was established in 1907 as the Japanese Journal of Cancer Research by Katsusaburō Yamagiwa (University of Tokyo), who first produced tumors in animals by painting tar on their skin. In 1908, he joined the Japanese Foundation for Cancer Research as the first president, and the journal became the official journal of the foundation. The journal was transferred to the Japanese Cancer Association in 1941 and able to continue its work throughout the Second World War. The name of the journal obtained its current name in 2003.

Association awards
The "Cancer Science Young Scientists Award for researchers in Asia" was established for the development of young researchers from the Asian region in the area of cancer research.

References

External links

Japanese Cancer Association

Publications established in 1907
Wiley-Blackwell academic journals
Oncology journals
English-language journals
Monthly journals